Macarretane is a town in southern Mozambique.

Nearby is the Macarretane Dam which dams the Limpopo River. It was constructed to maintain levels of water flow of the Chokwé irrigation system.

Transport 

It lies on the mainline of the southern system of Mozambique Railways where that railway bridges the Limpopo River.

See also 

 Transport in Mozambique
 Railway stations in Mozambique

References 

Populated places in Gaza Province